Global Diplomacy (GD) and Age of Discovery (AoD) are two variants of a play-by-email wargames run by Email Games. The games simulate strategic-level warfare and diplomacy at a late-19th century (c. 1880) technology level. The smallest units are of corps and squadron size. Whereas Global Diplomacy (and its sequel Global Diplomacy 2) attempt to simulate a world war, on Earth during the era of New Imperialism, Age of Discovery uses a randomly created map and world. There are a few other small differences between the two games. 

GD and AoD are derived from the board game, Diplomacy.

External links
Rules of Global Diplomacy and Age of Discovery
E-Mail Games

Computer wargames
Turn-based strategy video games
Age of Discovery video games
Play-by-email video games